Penne Dennison (born 3 September 1969) is an Australian music and television entertainment presenter.

Career
Dennison's first role as a television presenter was on WIN Television Wollongong. Penne has previously appeared on a national radio program hosted by Barry Bissell, Barry Bissell’s Weekly Countdown as an entertainment news and reporter for the show.

In 1998-1999 she was the original co-host with Jade Gatt on the late night Live Music and News Program Ground Zero, later Joined by Ugly Phil O’Neil and Jackie O, televised live on the Ten Network between 1998-1999. She has also worked on Hey Hey It’s Saturday, hosted by Daryl Somers in the late 1990s.

More recently, she has worked on Take 40 Australia, and as a presenter on Mornings with Kerri-Anne. She also presents on Foxtel's Movie Network.

Personal life
Dennison is divorced to Steven Marks (co-founder of Guzman y Gomez), and has two daughters.

References

External links
 
 Biography

1969 births
Living people
Australian television presenters
Australian women television presenters
Place of birth missing (living people)